Elad Peled ((11 November 1927 - 26 July 2021) was an Israeli general.

In the 1948 Arab–Israeli War he was a squad commander in the Yiftach Brigade. Peled commanded the 36th Division, which operated in the West Bank during the Six-Day War.

He was also later involved in the Yom Kippur War.

Following his retirement from the military, he obtained the position of Director General of the Ministry of Education and Culture.

He died on 26 July 2021.

References

1927 births
2021 deaths
Israeli generals
Palmach members
Israeli people of the 1948 Arab–Israeli War
Israeli people of the Six-Day War
Israeli people of the Yom Kippur War